Yon Garcia (born 2 July 1979) is a Spanish former competitive figure skater. He is a five-time Spanish national champion.

Programs

Results

References

External links
 

Spanish male single skaters
1979 births
Living people
Sportspeople from San Sebastián